Josué Odir Flores Palencia (born May 13, 1988, in Santa Ana, El Salvador) is a Salvadoran professional footballer.

Club career
Nicknamed El Chino, Flores played as a midfielder for Alianza after signing a contract with the club starting in the Clausura 2011 tournament. He previously played for FAS and Isidro Metapán before joining Alianza. He was named as the most valuable player for the Apertura 2009 final, after scoring one goal and leading FAS to its seventeenth title.

Zakho
In October 2013, he signed with Iraqi team Zakho.
During his first season abroad he made twelve appearances and scored four goals for Zakho as they finished in 10th position. Although his stay at Zakho ended once the conclusion of the season due to instability in Iraq, his impact on the field and off field was major that he became a fan favourite.

International career
Flores made his debut for El Salvador in a February 2010 friendly match against the United States.

References

1988 births
Living people
Sportspeople from Santa Ana, El Salvador
Association football midfielders
Salvadoran footballers
El Salvador international footballers
Salvadoran expatriate footballers
C.D. FAS footballers
A.D. Isidro Metapán footballers
Alianza F.C. footballers
2013 CONCACAF Gold Cup players
Expatriate footballers in Iraq
El Salvador under-20 international footballers
El Salvador youth international footballers
Salvadoran expatriate sportspeople in Iraq
Cimarrones de Sonora players
Salvadoran expatriate sportspeople in Mexico
Expatriate footballers in Mexico
C.D. Guastatoya players
Salvadoran expatriate sportspeople in Guatemala
Expatriate footballers in Guatemala
Cobán Imperial players